Philotheca epilosa is a species of flowering plant in the family Rutaceae and is endemic to eastern Australia. It is a shrub with egg-shaped to lance-shaped leaves with the narrower end toward the base and crowded near the ends of the glandular-warty branchlets, and white flowers usually arranged singly on the ends of the branchlets.

Description

Taxonomy and naming
This species was first formally described in 1970 by Paul G. Wilson who gave it the name Eriostemon myoporoides subsp. epilosus and published the description in the journal Nuytsia, from specimens collected by S.L. Boorman near Wallangarra in 1906. In 2005 Paul Irwin Forster raised the subspecies to species status as Philotheca epilosa in the journal Austrobaileya.

Distribution and habitat
Philotheca epilosa grows in heath and forest among granite boulers north from Deepwater and Torrington in northern New South Wales and near Stanthorpe in south-eastern Queensland.

References

epilosa
Flora of New South Wales
Flora of Queensland
Sapindales of Australia
Plants described in 1970
Taxa named by Paul G. Wilson